George Adam "Dutch" Distel (April 15, 1896 – February 12, 1967) was a second baseman in Major League Baseball. He played for the St. Louis Cardinals in 1918.

References

External links

1896 births
1967 deaths
Major League Baseball second basemen
St. Louis Cardinals players
Baseball players from Indiana
People from Madison, Indiana
Richmond Virginians (minor league) players
Milwaukee Brewers (minor league) players
Little Rock Travelers players
Galveston Pirates players
Galveston Sand Crabs players
Portland Beavers players
Wichita Falls Spudders players
Shreveport Sports players
Selma Cloverleafs players
Fort Wayne Chiefs players
Quincy Indians players